Kamohelo Abel Mahlatsi (born 23 August 1998) is a South African professional soccer player who plays as an attacking midfielder or centre forward for Kaizer Chiefs. He has also represented South Africa at under-23 and senior international levels.

Club career
Born in Sebokeng, Mahlatsi started his career at SuperSport United before joining Ubuntu Cape Town on loan until the end of the season in January 2018. He scored twice in 11 appearances for Ubuntu Cape Town, and was promoted to the senior SuperSport United squad ahead of the 2018–19 season. He played 9 times for the club across the 2018–19 season. In September 2019, he joined University of Pretoria of the National First Division on a season-long loan. He scored 10 goals in 27 league appearances for University of Pretoria.

On 6 October 2020, Mahlatsi signed for newly-promoted South African Premier Division side Moroka Swallows.

International career
Mahlatsi has represented South Africa at the 2019 COSAFA Cup and South Africa under-23s at the 2019 Africa U-23 Cup of Nations.

Style of play
Mahlatsi is left-footed and plays primarily as an attacking midfielder and a centre forward. In April 2018, he was described by The Sowetan as 'versatile', adding that "his close control with the ball, speed, dribbling, crossing, and ability to use both feet allow him to play in any offensive position on the field."

References

Living people
1998 births
South African soccer players
People from Sebokeng
Sportspeople from Gauteng
Association football midfielders
Association football forwards
SuperSport United F.C. players
Ubuntu Cape Town F.C. players
University of Pretoria F.C. players
Moroka Swallows F.C. players
Kaizer Chiefs F.C. players
South African Premier Division players
National First Division players
South Africa international soccer players
South Africa youth international soccer players
Footballers at the 2020 Summer Olympics
Olympic soccer players of South Africa